Roundaway is an unincorporated community located in Sunflower County, Mississippi.

On Jan 25, 1975, Johnny Russell (singer) saluted his home town of Roundaway, MS, pop. 35 on Hee Haw.

References

Unincorporated communities in Sunflower County, Mississippi
Unincorporated communities in Mississippi